Cherry Walk Creek is a  long first order tributary to Love Creek in Sussex County, Delaware.

Course
Cherry Walk Creek rises on the Sarah Run divide in Sussex County, Delaware.  Cherry Walk Creek then flows southeast and northeast to meet Love Creek about 0.5 miles north of Joy Beach.

Watershed

See also
List of rivers of Delaware

References 

Rivers of Delaware